Charlene M. Amoia is an American actress. She is best known for her recurring role as Wendy the Waitress in the sitcom How I Met Your Mother. Her film credits include American Reunion (2012), Authors Anonymous (2014), Harley Quinn: Birds of Prey (2020) and The Conjuring: The Devil Made Me Do It (2021), Sniper: Special Ops (2016).

Childhood and early career
Amoia was born in Buffalo, New York. She was raised in Buffalo and relocated to Las Vegas at the age of 15. She is of Italian and Spanish descent.

Career
She began her career in modeling, before making the transition to acting. She appeared in guest starring roles in numerous television shows, including Joey, The Resident, Shameless, and Man with a Plan.

She portrayed waitress Wendy in American sitcom How I Met Your Mother from 2005 to 2011. On playing Wendy, she has said, "I love playing flawed characters. Wendy is so genuinely sweet and guileless to a point that she doesn't realize she's being taken advantage of. Being able to take on these characteristics in a way that is funny and harmless is always so much fun!"

Amoia played Ellie, Kevin (Thomas Ian Nicholas)'s wife, in the fourth American Pie film, released in 2012.

Amoia portrayed Dr. Fraser on House, Bailey on Glee and Diana Cotto on Switched at Birth. In 2008, she portrayed Miss Wells in the teen drama television series 90210. She played Jill in the drama film Fat (2013), which premiered at the Toronto International Film Festival.

She has guest starred on the show NCIS: New Orleans as Carly Dawson in the episode "Breaking Brig" and Kelly Press on Major Crimes. She played Janet Conrad, a pushy NATO Photographer who was seeking a career changing "Front Line Photo" in the film Sniper: Special Ops (2016). In 2017 she appeared on American Horror Story in the episode "Great Again". In season 14 of Grey's Anatomy she appeared as Dr. Kate Lachman.

Filmography

Film

Television

References

External links

StayFamous.net Interview for "American Reunion"
MassLive.com Interview for "How I Met Your Mother"
FitCeleb.com Interview for "American Reunion"

21st-century American actresses
American film actresses
American television actresses
American people of Italian descent
American people of Spanish descent
People from Buffalo, New York
People from Las Vegas
1982 births
Living people